Vira  Narasimha Raya (or  Vira Narasimha Vira Narasimha III) (reigned 1505–1509)  became the king of Vijayanagar empire after the death of Tuluva Narasa Nayaka. Krishna Deva Raya was his younger half-brother.

The death of their capable father Tuluva Narasa Nayaka resulted in feudatories rising in rebellion everywhere. In his writings, Fernão Nunes noted that the whole world had risen in rebellion. At first, Immadi Narasa Nayaka, the eldest son of saluva Narasa Nayaka became king and lasted at the throne for two years before being assassinated. Vira Narasimha Raya was next crowned in 1505 and spent all his years fighting rebel warlords.

Yusuf Adil Khan of Bijapur tried to extend his domains south of the Tungabhadra. The Vijayanagar regent was supported by Aliya Rama Raya of the Aravidu family and his son Thimma. With their help, Adil Khan was defeated and pushed back. Adoni and Kurnool area became a part of Vijayanagar Empire. During this time, the chief of Ummathur was again in revolt and Vira Narasimha Raya set out south to quell the rebellion, having placed Krishna Deva Raya as the ruler in absence. Portuguese Empire assisted king Raya's forces in this conflict, providing horses and artillery, in exchange seeking control of the port of Bhatkal. Concerted efforts by Vira Narasimha Raya to quell the rebellion in Ummatur had mixed results. 

In 1509 when on his death bed, legend has it that Vira Narasimha Raya requested his minister Saluva Timma (Timmarasa) to blind his younger brother Krishna Deva Raya so that his own eight-year-old son could become king of Vijayanagar. Timmarasa however brought a pair of she-goat eyes to the king and informed him that he had Krishna Deva Raya killed. However, there is no record to prove anything but a friendly relationship between the two half brothers and that the coronation of Krishna Deva Raya was a smooth one.

Notes

References
 Prof K.A. Nilakanta Sastry, History of South India, From Prehistoric times to fall of Vijayanagar, 1955, OUP, New Delhi (Reprinted 2002)

1509 deaths
16th-century Indian monarchs
Tulu people
People of the Vijayanagara Empire
Indian Hindus
Hindu monarchs
1509 in India
1505 in India